Norway is a sovereign and unitary monarchy whose territory comprises the western portion of the Scandinavian Peninsula plus the island Jan Mayen and the archipelago of Svalbard.

The country maintains a combination of market economy and a Nordic welfare model with universal health care and a comprehensive social security system. Norway has extensive reserves of petroleum, natural gas, minerals, lumber, seafood, fresh water and hydropower. The petroleum industry accounts for around a quarter of the country's gross domestic product (GDP). On a per-capita basis, Norway is the world's largest producer of oil and natural gas outside the Middle East.

For further information on the types of business entities in this country and their abbreviations, see "Business entities in Norway".

Largest firms 
This list shows firms in the Fortune Global 500, which ranks firms by total revenues reported before March 31, 2017. Only the top five firms (if available) are included as a sample.

Notable firms 
This list includes notable companies with primary headquarters located in the country. The industry and sector follow the Industry Classification Benchmark taxonomy. Organizations which have ceased operations are included and noted as defunct.

See also 
 List of airlines of Norway
 List of banks in Norway
 List of bus companies of Norway
 List of companies listed on Oslo Axess
 List of government enterprises of Norway
 List of the largest companies of Norway
 List of supermarket chains in Norway

References 

Norway